Edgardo Maldonado (born 11 September 1991) is an Argentine professional footballer who plays as a midfielder.

Career
Maldonado featured for El Fortin in Torneo Argentino C in 2011, prior to spending the 2013–14 Torneo Argentino A season with Agropecuario; making thirteen appearances. Ferro Carril Sud signed Maldonado in 2014, with the midfielder scoring four goals in thirty-six games for the club over two seasons. After returning to El Fortin in 2015, Maldonado departed a year later to rejoin Agropecuario of Torneo Federal A. They won promotion to Primera B Nacional in 2016–17, with Maldonado making his professional debut against Boca Unidos in December 2017. Ten more appearances followed in that campaign.

Career statistics
.

Honours
Agropecuario
 Torneo Federal A: 2016–17

References

External links

1991 births
Living people
Sportspeople from Buenos Aires Province
Argentine footballers
Association football midfielders
Torneo Argentino B players
Torneo Federal A players
Primera Nacional players
Club Agropecuario Argentino players